Kempten railway station, or Kempten station, may refer to:

Kempten (Allgäu) Hauptbahnhof, the main station for the town of Kempten in the German state of Bavaria
Kempten Ost railway station, another station in the town of Kempten in the German state of Bavaria
Kempten railway station (Switzerland), serving the village of Kempten in the Swiss canton of Zurich